Windows code pages are sets of characters or code pages (known as character encodings in other operating systems) used in Microsoft Windows from the 1980s and 1990s. Windows code pages were gradually superseded when Unicode was implemented in Windows, although they are still supported both within Windows and other platforms, and still apply when Alt code shortcuts are used.

There are two groups of system code pages in Windows systems: OEM and Windows-native ("ANSI") code pages. 
(ANSI is the American National Standards Institute.) Code pages in both of these groups are extended ASCII code pages. Additional code pages are supported by standard Windows conversion routines, but not used as either type of system code page.

ANSI code page

ANSI code pages (officially called "Windows code pages"                    after Microsoft accepted the former term being a misnomer          )          are used for native non-Unicode (say, byte oriented) applications using a graphical user interface on Windows systems. The term "ANSI" is a misnomer because these Windows code pages do not comply with any ANSI (American National Standards Institute) standard; code page 1252 was based on an early ANSI draft that became the international standard ISO 8859-1,                    which adds a further 32 control codes and space for 96 printable characters. Among other differences, Windows code-pages allocate printable characters to the supplementary control code space, making them at best illegible to standards-compliant operating systems.)

Most legacy "ANSI" code pages have code page numbers in the pattern 125x. However, 874 (Thai) and the East Asian multi-byte "ANSI" code pages (932, 936, 949, 950), all of which are also used as OEM code pages, are numbered to match IBM encodings, none of which are identical to the Windows encodings (although most are similar). While code page 1258 is also used as an OEM code page, it is original to Microsoft rather than an extension to an existing encoding. IBM have assigned their own, different numbers for Microsoft's variants, these are given for reference in the lists below where applicable.

All of the 125x Windows code pages, as well as 874 and 936, are labelled by Internet Assigned Numbers Authority (IANA) as "Windows-number", although "Windows-936" is treated as a synonym for "GBK". Windows code page 932 is instead labelled as "Windows-31J".

ANSI Windows code pages, and especially the code page 1252, were so called since they were purportedly based on drafts submitted or intended for ANSI. However, ANSI and ISO have not standardized any of these code pages. Instead they are either:
 Supersets of the standard sets such as those of ISO 8859 and the various national standards (like Windows-1252 vs. ISO-8859-1),
 Major modifications of these (making them incompatible to various degrees, like Windows-1250 vs. ISO-8859-2)
 Having no parallel encoding (like Windows-1257 vs. ISO-8859-4; ISO-8859-13 was introduced much later). Also, Windows-1251 follows neither the ISO-standardised ISO-8859-5 nor the then-prevailing KOI-8.

Microsoft assigned about twelve of the typography and business characters (including notably, the euro sign, €) in CP1252 to the code points 0x80–0x9F that, in ISO 8859, are assigned to C1 control codes. These assignments are also present in many other ANSI/Windows code pages at the same code-points. Windows did not use the C1 control codes, so this decision had no direct effect on Windows users. However, if included in a file transferred to a standards-compliant platform like Unix or MacOS, the information was invisible and potentially disruptive.

OEM code page 
The OEM code pages (original equipment manufacturer) are used by Win32 console applications, and by virtual DOS, and can be considered a holdover from DOS and the original IBM PC architecture. A separate suite of code pages was implemented not only due to compatibility, but also because the fonts of VGA (and descendant) hardware suggest encoding of line-drawing characters to be compatible with code page 437. Most OEM code pages share many code points, particularly for non-letter characters, with the second (non-ASCII) half of CP437.

A typical OEM code page, in its second half, does not resemble any ANSI/Windows code page even roughly. Nevertheless, two single-byte, fixed-width code pages (874 for Thai and 1258 for Vietnamese) and four multibyte CJK code pages (932, 936, 949, 950) are used as both OEM and ANSI code pages. Code page 1258 uses combining diacritics, as Vietnamese requires more than 128 letter-diacritic combinations. This is in contrast to VISCII, which replaces some of the C0 (i.e. ASCII) control codes.

History 
Initially, computer systems and system programming languages did not make a distinction between characters and bytes: for the segmental scripts used in most of Africa, the Americas, southern and south-east Asia, the Middle East and Europe, a character needs just one byte, but two or more bytes are needed for the ideographic sets used in the rest of the world. This led to much confusion subsequently. Microsoft software and systems prior to the Windows NT line are examples of this, because they use the OEM and ANSI code pages that do not make the distinction.

Since the late 1990s, software and systems have adopted Unicode as their preferred storage format; this trend has been improved by the widespread adoption of XML which default to UTF-8 but also provides a mechanism for labelling the encoding used. All current Microsoft products and application program interfaces use Unicode internally, but some applications continue to use the default encoding of the computer's 'locale' when reading and writing text data to files or standard output. Therefore, files may still be encountered that are legible and intelligible in one part of the world but unintelligible mojibake in another.

UTF-8, UTF-16 
Microsoft adopted a Unicode encoding (first the now-obsolete UCS-2, which was then Unicode's only encoding), i.e. UTF-16 for all its operating systems from Windows NT onwards, but additionally supports UTF-8 (aka CP_UTF8) since Windows 10 version 1803.
UTF-16 uniquely encodes all Unicode characters in the Basic Multilingual Plane (BMP) using 16 bits but the remaining Unicode (e.g. emojis) is encoded with a 32-bit (four byte) code while the rest of the industry (Unix-like systems and the web), and now Microsoft chose UTF-8 (which uses one byte for the 7-bit ASCII character set, two or three bytes for other characters in the BMP, and four bytes for the remainder).

List 

The following Windows code pages exist:

Windows-125x series 
These nine code pages are all extended ASCII 8-bit SBCS encodings, and were designed by Microsoft for use as ANSI codepages on Windows. They are commonly known by their IANA-registered names as windows-<number>, but are also sometimes called cp<number>, "cp" for "code page". They are all used as ANSI code pages; Windows-1258 is also used as an OEM code page.

The Windows-125x series includes nine of the ANSI code pages, and mostly covers scripts from Europe and West Asia with the addition of Vietnam. System encodings for Thai and for East Asian languages were numbered to match similar IBM code pages and are used as both ANSI and OEM code pages; these are covered in following sections.

DOS code pages 
These are also ASCII-based. Most of these are included for use as OEM code pages; code page 874 is also used as an ANSI code page.

 437 – IBM PC US, 8-bit SBCS extended ASCII. Known as OEM-US, the encoding of the primary built-in font of VGA graphics cards.
 708 – Arabic, extended ISO 8859-6 (ASMO 708)
 720 – Arabic, retaining box drawing characters in their usual locations
 737 – "MS-DOS Greek". Retains all box drawing characters. More popular than 869.
 775 – "MS-DOS Baltic Rim"
 850 – "MS-DOS Latin 1". Full (re-arranged) repertoire of ISO 8859-1.
 852 – "MS-DOS Latin 2"
 855 – "MS-DOS Cyrillic". Mainly used for South Slavic languages. Includes (re-arranged) repertoire of ISO-8859-5. Not to be confused with cp866.
 857 – "MS-DOS Turkish"
 858 – Western European with euro sign
 860 – "MS-DOS Portuguese"
 861 – "MS-DOS Icelandic"
 862 – "MS-DOS Hebrew"
 863 – "MS-DOS French Canada"
 864 – Arabic
 865 – "MS-DOS Nordic"
 866 – "MS-DOS Cyrillic Russian", cp866. Sole purely OEM code page (rather than ANSI or both) included as a legacy encoding in WHATWG Encoding Standard for HTML5.
 869 – "MS-DOS Greek 2", IBM869. Full (re-arranged) repertoire of ISO 8859-7.
 874 – Thai, also used as the ANSI code page, extends ISO 8859-11 (and therefore TIS-620) with a few additional characters from Windows-1252. Corresponds to IBM code page 1162 (IBM-874 is similar but has different extensions).

East Asian multi-byte code pages 
These often differ from the IBM code pages of the same number: code pages 932, 949 and 950 only partly match the IBM code pages of the same number, while the number 936 was used by IBM for another Simplified Chinese encoding which is now deprecated and Windows-951, as part of a kludge, is unrelated to IBM-951. IBM equivalent code pages are given in the second column. Code pages 932, 936, 949 and 950/951 are used as both ANSI and OEM code pages on the locales in question.

A few further multiple-byte code pages are supported for decoding or encoding using operating system libraries, but not used as either sort of system encoding in any locale.

EBCDIC code pages 

 37 – IBM EBCDIC US-Canada, 8-bit SBCS 
 500 – Latin 1
 870 – IBM870
 875 – cp875
 1026 – EBCDIC Turkish
 1047 – IBM01047 – Latin 1
 1140 – IBM01141
 1141 – IBM01141
 1142 – IBM01142
 1143 – IBM01143
 1144 – IBM01144
 1145 – IBM01145
 1146 – IBM01146
 1147 – IBM01147
 1148 – IBM01148
 1149 – IBM01149
 20273 – EBCDIC Germany
 20277 – EBCDIC Denmark/Norway
 20278 – EBCDIC Finland/Sweden
 20280 – EBCDIC Italy
 20284 – EBCDIC Latin America/Spain
 20285 – EBCDIC United Kingdom
 20290 – EBCDIC Japanese
 20297 – EBCDIC France
 20420 – EBCDIC Arabic
 20423 – EBCDIC Greek
 20424 – x-EBCDIC-KoreanExtended
 20833 – Korean
 20838 – EBCDIC Thai
 20924 – IBM00924 – IBM EBCDIC Latin 1/Open System (1047 + Euro symbol)
 20871 – EBCDIC Icelandic
 20880 – EBCDIC Cyrillic
 20905 – EBCDIC Turkish
 21025 – EBCDIC Cyrillic
 21027 – Japanese EBCDIC (incomplete, deprecated)

Unicode-related code pages 

 1200 – Unicode (BMP of ISO 10646, UTF-16LE). Available only to managed applications.
 1201 – Unicode (UTF-16BE). Available only to managed applications.
 12000 – UTF-32. Available only to managed applications.
 12001 – UTF-32. Big-endian. Available only to managed applications.
 65000 – Unicode (UTF-7)
 65001 – Unicode (UTF-8)

Macintosh compatibility code pages 

 10000 – Apple Macintosh Roman
 10001 – Apple Macintosh Japanese
 10002 – Apple Macintosh Chinese (traditional) (BIG-5)
 10003 – Apple Macintosh Korean
 10004 – Apple Macintosh Arabic
 10005 – Apple Macintosh Hebrew
 10006 – Apple Macintosh Greek
 10007 – Apple Macintosh Cyrillic
 10008 – Apple Macintosh Chinese (simplified) (GB 2312)
 10010 – Apple Macintosh Romanian
 10017 – Apple Macintosh Ukrainian
 10021 – Apple Macintosh Thai
 10029 – Apple Macintosh Roman II / Central Europe
 10079 – Apple Macintosh Icelandic
 10081 – Apple Macintosh Turkish
 10082 – Apple Macintosh Croatian

ISO 8859 code pages 

 28591 – ISO-8859-1 – Latin-1 (IBM equivalent: 819)
 28592 – ISO-8859-2 – Latin-2
 28593 – ISO-8859-3 – Latin-3 or South European
 28594 – ISO-8859-4 – Latin-4 or North European
 28595 – ISO-8859-5 – Latin/Cyrillic
 28596 – ISO-8859-6 – Latin/Arabic
 28597 – ISO-8859-7 – Latin/Greek
 28598 – ISO-8859-8 – Latin/Hebrew
 28599 – ISO-8859-9 – Latin-5 or Turkish
 28600 – ISO-8859-10 – Latin-6
 28601 – ISO-8859-11 – Latin/Thai
 28602 – ISO-8859-12 – reserved for Latin/Devanagari but abandoned (not supported)
 28603 – ISO-8859-13 – Latin-7 or Baltic Rim
 28604 – ISO-8859-14 – Latin-8 or Celtic
 28605 – ISO-8859-15 – Latin-9
 28606 – ISO-8859-16 – Latin-10 or South-Eastern European
 38596 – ISO-8859-6- – Latin/Arabic (logical bidirectional order)
 38598 – ISO-8859-8- – Latin/Hebrew (logical bidirectional order)

ITU-T code pages 

 20105 – 7-bit IA5 IRV (Western European)
 20106 – 7-bit IA5 German (DIN 66003)
 20107 – 7-bit IA5 Swedish (SEN 850200 C)
 20108 – 7-bit IA5 Norwegian (NS 4551-2)
 20127 – 7-bit US-ASCII
 20261 – T.61 (T.61-8bit)
 20269 – ISO-6937

KOI8 code pages 
 20866 – Russian – KOI8-R
 21866 – Ukrainian – KOI8-U (or KOI8-RU in some versions)

Problems arising from the use of code pages 
Microsoft strongly recommends using Unicode in modern applications, but many applications or data files still depend on the legacy code pages. 
 Programs need to know what code page to use in order to display the contents of (pre-Unicode) files correctly. If a program uses the wrong code page it may show text as mojibake.
 The code page in use may differ between machines, so (pre-Unicode) files created on one machine may be unreadable on another.
 Data is often improperly tagged with the code page, or not tagged at all, making determination of the correct code page to read the data difficult.
 These Microsoft code pages differ to various degrees from some of the standards and other vendors' implementations.  This isn't a Microsoft issue per se, as it happens to all vendors, but the lack of consistency makes interoperability with other systems unreliable in some cases.
 The use of code pages limits the set of characters that may be used.
 Characters expressed in an unsupported code page may be converted to question marks (?) or other replacement characters, or to a simpler version (such as removing accents from a letter). In either case, the original character may be lost.

See also 
 AppLocale – a utility to run non-Unicode (code page-based) applications in a locale of the user's choice.

References

External links
 National Language Support (NLS) API Reference. Table showing ANSI and OEM codepages per language (from web-archive since Microsoft removed the original page)
 IANA Charset Name Registrations
 Unicode mapping table for Windows code pages
 Unicode mappings of windows code pages with "best fit"